Doldina is a genus of assassin bugs in the family Reduviidae. There are about eight described species in Doldina.

Species
These eight species belong to the genus Doldina:
 Doldina bicarinata Stål, 1866
 Doldina carinulata Stål, 1859
 Doldina cubana Barber & Bruner, 1946
 Doldina interjungens Bergroth, 1913
 Doldina lauta (Stål, 1860)
 Doldina limera Hussey & Elkins, 1955
 Doldina penalea Hussey & Elkins, 1955
 Doldina praetermissa Bergroth

References

Further reading

 
 

Reduviidae
Articles created by Qbugbot